The 1882 Lake Forest football team represented Lake Forest College during the 1882 college football season.

Schedule

References

Lake Forest
Lake Forest Foresters football seasons
Lake Forest football